The S8 district lies within in the City of Sheffield, South Yorkshire, England.  The district contains 69 listed buildings that are recorded in the National Heritage List for England.  Of these, six are listed at Grade II*, the middle grade, and the others are at Grade II, the lowest grade.  The district is in the south of the city of Sheffield, and covers the areas of Batemoor, Beauchief, Greenhill, Jordanthorpe, Lowedges, Meersbrook, Norton, Norton Lees and Woodseats, and part of Heeley.

For neighbouring areas, see listed buildings in S2, listed buildings in S7, listed buildings in S12, listed buildings in S14, listed buildings in S17, listed buildings in Dronfield and listed buildings in Eckington, Derbyshire.



Key

Buildings

References 

 - A list of all the listed buildings within Sheffield City Council's boundary is available to download from this page.

Sources

 
Sheffield